Mustafabad Assembly constituency is a Vidhan Sabha constituency in Delhi. It is a part of the North East Delhi Lok Sabha constituency. Present geographical structure of Mustafabad constituency came into existence in 2008 as a part of the implementation of the recommendations of the Delimitation Commission of India constituted in 2002.

Members of Legislative Assembly
Key

Election results

2020

2015

2013

2008

References

Assembly constituencies of Delhi
Delhi Legislative Assembly